Mazgi may refer to:
 Sefid Mazgi ("White Mazgi")
 Siah Mazgi ("Black Mazgi")